Rules of Engagement is the eleventh historical mystery novel about Sir John Fielding by Bruce Alexander (a pseudonym for Bruce Cook). The manuscript was unfinished when Cook died in 2003, but his widow, Judith Aller, and writer John Shannon worked together to complete it.

Plot summary
Sir John and Jeremy are confronted with a series of bizarre deaths (including an unmotivated suicide) on the streets of Georgian London in a mystery that tests even Sir John's legendary skills of deduction. This book ends the series.

2005 American novels
Sir John Fielding series
G. P. Putnam's Sons books